Fighting Blood is a 1911 American short silent Western film directed by D. W. Griffith and starring George Nichols. It features Lionel Barrymore, Mae Marsh and Blanche Sweet. A print of the film survives in the film archive of George Eastman House Motion Picture Collection.

Cast
 George Nichols as The Old Soldier
 Kate Bruce as The Old Soldier's Wife
 Robert Harron as The Old Soldier's Son
 Lionel Barrymore
 Mae Marsh
 Blanche Sweet
 Kate Toncray as The Son's Girlfriend's Mother

See also
 List of American films of 1911
 D. W. Griffith filmography
 Blanche Sweet filmography
 Lionel Barrymore filmography

References

External links
 

1911 films
1911 Western (genre) films
1911 short films
American black-and-white films
American silent short films
Films directed by D. W. Griffith
Silent American Western (genre) films
1910s American films
1910s English-language films